Tropical Airplay is a chart published by Billboard magazine that ranks the top-performing songs (regardless of genre or language) on tropical radio stations in the United States, based on weekly airplay data compiled by Nielsen's Broadcast Data Systems. It is a subchart of Hot Latin Songs, which lists the best-performing Spanish-language songs in the country. In 1999, 11 songs topped the chart, in 52 issues of the magazine.

The first number one of the year was "El Cuerpo Me Pide" by Víctor Manuelle and Elvis Crespo from the Christmas compilation album Tarjeta de Navidad, Vol. 2 (1998). The song moved into the top spot in the issue dated January 9. It remained in place for only a single week before being replaced by "Mi PC" by Juan Luis Guerra which had previously topped the chart in the week ending December 12, 1998, and spent two further weeks at number one in 1999 for a total of five. Víctor Manuelle also had the final one of 1999 with "Pero Dile", which was the longest-running number one of the year with nine weeks. Guerra achieved his second number one of the year with "Palomita Blanca". "Mi PC" was succeeded by Jerry Rivera's song "Ese", which remained on top of the chart for eight weeks and is his fifth number one overall. "Ese" and "Déjate Querer" by Gilberto Santa Rosa had the longest consecutive run at number one in 1999 with eight weeks. 

Tito Rojas obtained his second and final chart-topper with his cover version of Pepe Aguilar's song "Por Mujeres Como Tú". Jennifer Lopez reached number one for the first time with "No Me Ames", a duet with Marc Anthony and was the only female artist to do so on the Tropical Airplay chart in 1999. The salsa version of "No Me Ames", titled as the "tropical remix", was commercially released to tropical radio stations by Sony Discos. Marc Anthony also achieved his 12th number one with "Dímelo", the Spanish-language version of "I Need to Know".

Chart history

References

1999
United States Latin Tropical Airplay
1999 in Latin music